Little Delaware River is a river in Delaware County, New York. It begins along the western slope of Plattekill Mountain, northeast of the Hamlet of Bovina and flows generally westward before converging with the West Branch Delaware River by the Village of Delhi.

Fishing
In the Little Delaware River the wild brown trout and brook trout populations are supplemented with the stocking of about 700 brown trout yearlings each year. The fish are stocked in a  zone at the mouth and a  zone downstream of the hamlet of Bovina Center. Brown trout are the dominant wild trout in the stream, but there are also large amounts of brook trout upstream of Bovina Center.

Watershed

The Little Delaware River's watershed makes up for 7.84% of the West Branch Delaware River's drainage area.

Hydrology

The United States Geological Survey (USGS) maintains one stream gauge along the Little Delaware River.

The station by the Village of Delhi has been in operation since October 1937, but only making maximum measurements since December 1996.

References

Rivers of New York (state)
Rivers of Delaware County, New York
Tributaries of the West Branch Delaware River